The 1956 George Washington Colonials football team was an American football team that represented George Washington University as an independent during the 1956 NCAA University Division football season. In its fifth season under head coach Bo Sherman, the team compiled an 8–1–1 record (5–1 against conference records), finished third in the Southern Conference (SoCon), and outscored opponents by a total of 171 to 81.

The team won the 1957 Sun Bowl over Texas Western (now UTEP) which is GW’s only football bowl game.

The team's statistical leaders included Ray Looney with 262 passing yards, Pete Spera with 345 rushing yards, and Paul Thompson with 156 receiving yards.

Schedule

References

George Washington
George Washington Colonials football seasons
Sun Bowl champion seasons
George Washington Colonials football